Woodthorpe is part of the Borough of Gedling in Nottinghamshire, England, next to the Nottingham city boundary and the areas of Mapperley, Daybrook, Sherwood and Arnold.

References

Areas of Nottingham
Gedling